Noli Me Tángere is a 1961 Philippine period drama film co-written and directed by Gerardo de León. Based on the 1887 novel of the same name by José Rizal, it stars Eduardo del Mar, Edita Vital, Johnny Monteiro, Oscar Keesee, Teody Belarmino, and Leopoldo Salcedo. The film was released on June 16, 1961, timed with the centenary of Rizal's birth.

Noli Me Tángere won five FAMAS Awards, including Best Picture and Best Director. The film is now considered a classic in Philippine cinema.

Cast
Eduardo del Mar as Crisostomo Ibarra
Edita Vital as Maria Clara
Johnny Monteiro as Padre Salvi
Oscar Keesee as Padre Damaso
Teody Belarmino as Tarcilo
Leopoldo Salcedo as Elias
Ramon d'Salva as Alferez
Ruben Rustia as Maestro
Max Alvarado as Lucas
Nello Nayo as Don Filipo
Engracio Ibarra as Don Tiago
Lilian Laing de Leon as Dña. Victorina
Veronica Palileo as Isabel
Joseph de Cordova as Pablo
Manny Ojeda as Tenyente Guevarra
Fred Gonzales as Pilosopong Tacio
Lito Anzures as Sarhento
Andres Centenera as Alkalde
Jose Garcia as Kapitan Heneral
Pianing Vidal as Dr. Espadaña
Dely Villanueva as Dña. Consolacion
Luis San Juan as Pedro
Francisco Cruz as Gobernadorcillo
Salvador Zaragoza as Sakristan Mayor
Jerry Pons as Linares
Lina Cariño as Sisa
Dik Trofeo

Production
Filipino painter Carlos V. Francisco served as the production designer for Noli Me Tángere.

Restoration
In 1989, the only surviving film print of Noli Me Tángere was discovered to be in poor condition, upon which the German Embassy of the Philippines and Goethe-Institut requested the Federal Foreign Office of Germany to retrieve and rescue the film. In Koblenz, Germany, the film was successfully restored by Fruitzer Black Archive and the Federal Film Archive, and within the same year was sent back to the Philippines. The Philippine Information Agency later made a copy of the restored negative, with the duplicate print used for the 1990 premiere of the remastered version at the Cultural Center of the Philippines.

Re-release
As part of the 150th anniversary celebration of José Rizal's birth, Noli Me Tángere was given a re-release in select SM Cinemas throughout the Philippines in June 2011.

Accolades

References

1961 films
1960s historical drama films
Films about Catholic priests
Films about social issues
Films based on Philippine novels
Films directed by Gerardo de León
Films set in Laguna (province)
Films set in the 19th century
Philippine historical drama films
Tagalog-language films